In Greek philosophy, eupraxis or eupraxia is a fundamental concept in ethics, which has subtle meanings, suggesting an "ethical life-stance".  This is similar in meaning to eupraxsophy, a word coined in the 20th century by secular humanist philosopher Paul Kurtz.

For Aristotle, eupraxia, defined as 'acting well', has three components. One must not merely do the right thing, but choose to do it for the right reasons and do it habitually.

References

Concepts in ancient Greek ethics